Garibaldi, the English title of the film originally released as Viva l'Italia!, is a 1961 Italian drama film directed by Roberto Rossellini.

Synopsis
The film shows how Italy's historic national hero Giuseppe Garibaldi leads a military campaign known as the Expedition of the Thousand in 1860 and conquers Sicily and Naples. When the Bourbon monarchy has left Southern Italy, he supports Victor Emmanuel II of Italy who achieves a lasting unification under the aegis of the House of Savoy.

Background
Roberto Rossellini stated he was more proud of this film than of any other film he ever made.

References

External links

1961 films
French historical drama films
Italian historical drama films
1960s Italian-language films
1960s historical drama films
Films directed by Roberto Rossellini
Films set in the 1860s
Films set in Sicily
Films shot in Matera
Cultural depictions of Giuseppe Garibaldi
1961 drama films
Films scored by Renzo Rossellini
1960s Italian films
1960s French films